Harbourton is an unincorporated community located within Hopewell Township in Mercer County, New Jersey, United States. It is located along County Route 579 at the intersection with Harbourton-Mount Airy Road. The Harbourton Historic District, encompassing the community, was listed on the state and national registers of historic places in 1974.

Historic district

The Harbourton Historic District is a  historic district encompassing the community around the junction of Harbourton/Rocktown and Harbourton/Mt. Airy Roads. It was added to the National Register of Historic Places on December 31, 1974 for its significance in agriculture, architecture, and commerce.  The district includes seven contributing buildings. The oldest section of the village store was built in 1768, and operated as a store until 1962. It is now a private residence. The Baptist Church features Carpenter Gothic architecture.

See also
 National Register of Historic Places listings in Mercer County, New Jersey

References

External links
 
 

Hopewell Township, Mercer County, New Jersey
Unincorporated communities in Mercer County, New Jersey
Unincorporated communities in New Jersey